India as I Knew It is a book by Sir Michael O'Dwyer, Indian Civil Service (ICS) officer and later the Lieutenant Governor of Punjab, British India between 1913 and 1919. It covers his memories of the period 1885 to 1925, and was published in 1925 by Constable and Company. It includes his account of the Amritsar troubles in 1919. It was printed in England, has two maps, a preface, 21 chapters, and is dedicated to O'Dwyer's wife.

References

External links
 

1925 non-fiction books
20th-century history books
History books about India
Constable & Co. books